Thermic siphons (alt. thermic syphons) are heat-exchanging elements in the firebox or combustion chamber of some steam boiler and steam locomotive designs. As they are directly exposed to the radiant heat of combustion, they have a high evaporative capacity relative to their size. By arranging them near-vertically, they also have good water circulation by means of the thermosyphon effect.

History
The concept of a self-circulating thermic syphon began with stationary boilers and relatively simple Galloway tubes. They reached their peak in steam locomotive boilers, where the complexity of a syphon was justified by the need for a compact and lightweight means of increasing boiler capacity. One of the best-known forms for locomotives was invented by the English locomotive engineer  who received a US patent. The Nicholson form combined a complex shape that provided more heating area in a given space than did the earlier tubes and funnels, yet was simple to make, being folded from a single sheet of steel.

Flued boilers

The first high-pressure boilers were a large drum with a central flue, such as the Cornish and Lancashire boilers. Simple tubes were inserted across this flue.

See also
Thermosiphon

References

External links

Photo of lower tube-sections of thermic siphons on Battle of Britain class no. 34059 Sir Archibald Sinclair

Boilers
Locomotive parts